Nowhere may refer to:

Music 
 Nowhere (album), an album by Ride
 Nowhere: Music from the Gregg Araki Movie, a soundtrack album from the 1997 film (see below)
 "Nowhere" (song), a song by Therapy?
 "Nowhere", a song by 112 from Pleasure & Pain
 "Nowhere", a song by The Birthday Massacre from Looking Glass
 "Nowhere", a song by Bubba Sparxxx from Deliverance
 "Nowhere", a song by FictionJunction Yuuka, a B-side of the single "Hitomi no Kakera"
 "Nowhere", a song by Katatonia from Sounds of Decay
 "Nowhere", a song by Murderdolls from Women and Children Last
 "Nowhere", a song by The Naked Brothers Band from The Naked Brothers Band
 "Nowhere", a song by Pantha du Prince
 "Nowhere", a song by The Pillows from Little Busters

Other art and entertainment 
 Nowhere (film) a 1997 film directed by Greg Araki
 NoWhere (event), a European arts-based festival inspired by the Burning Man festival 
 Nowhere, a 1985 novel by Thomas Berger
 Nowhere, Kansas, the fictional setting of the animated TV series Courage the Cowardly Dog
 Nowhere, a proposed television series developed as Lost

Places 
 Nowhere, Norfolk, England, United Kingdom
 Nowhere, Oklahoma, United States
 Nowhere, a location in the Atlantic Ocean, at 0° latitude, 0° longitude and 0' elevation, near Cape Three Points

See also 
 Bridge to Nowhere (disambiguation)
 Middle of Nowhere (disambiguation)
 Nowhere Man (disambiguation)
 Erewhon, an 1872 novel by Samuel Butler
 Knowhere, a fictional location in Marvel comics